Samuel Peak is the 540 m peak in central Vidin Heights, Livingston Island, in the South Shetland Islands, Antarctica. Surmounting Panega Glacier to the east and Kaliakra Glacier to the south.

The peak is named after the American sealing ship Samuel under Captain Robert Inott, which visited the islands in 1820–21.

Location
(British mapping in 1968, Bulgarian in 2005 and 2009).

Maps
 L.L. Ivanov et al. Antarctica: Livingston Island and Greenwich Island, South Shetland Islands. Scale 1:100000 topographic map. Sofia: Antarctic Place-names Commission of Bulgaria, 2005.
 L.L. Ivanov. Antarctica: Livingston Island and Greenwich, Robert, Snow and Smith Islands. Scale 1:120000 topographic map.  Troyan: Manfred Wörner Foundation, 2009.

External links
 Composite Antarctic Gazetteer.

Mountains of Livingston Island